Silent speech interface is a device that allows speech communication without using the sound made when people vocalize their speech sounds. As such it is a type of electronic lip reading. It works by the computer identifying the phonemes that an individual pronounces from nonauditory sources of information about their speech movements. These are then used to recreate the speech using speech synthesis.

Information sources

Silent speech interface systems have been created using ultrasound and optical camera input of tongue and lip movements. Electromagnetic devices are another technique for tracking tongue and lip movements. The detection of speech movements by electromyography of speech articulator
muscles and the larynx is another technique. Another source of information is the vocal tract resonance signals that get transmitted through bone conduction called non-audible murmurs. 
They have also been created as a brain–computer interface using brain activity in the motor cortex  obtained from intracortical microelectrodes.

Uses
Such devices are created as aids to those unable to create the sound phonation needed for audible speech such as after laryngectomies. Another use is for communication when speech is masked by background noise or distorted by self-contained breathing apparatus. A further practical use is where a need exists for silent communication, such as when privacy is required in a public place, or hands-free data silent transmission is needed during a military or security operation.

In 2002, the Japanese company NTT DoCoMo announced it had created a silent mobile phone using electromyography and imaging of lip movement. "The spur to developing such a phone," the company said, "was ridding public places of noise," adding that, "the technology is also expected to help people who have permanently lost their voice." The feasibility of using silent speech interfaces for practical communication has since then been shown.

Recent Development and Research
Alter Ego - Arnav Kapur
A 2019 study by MIT Researcher, Arnav Kapur, has developed a Silent Speech Interface, AlterEgo, which effectively serves as a brain-computer interface and requires only subtle stimulation of the speech muscles to operate. Kapur's Research Paper delves into the development and accuracy of such a device. His research has sparked the community into further developing this new and emerging research

SpeakUP - Varun Chandrashekhar
A 2021 study by Varun Chandrashekhar also involves the development of a Silent Speech Interface, SpeakUp. This study was targeted at making a low-cost Silent Speech Interface using Commercially available sentences and identifying the best signal to speech algorithm to use in these types of devices

In fiction

The decoding of silent speech using a computer played an important role in Arthur C. Clarke's story and Stanley Kubrick's associated film  A Space Odyssey. In this, HAL 9000, a computer controlling spaceship Discovery One, bound for Jupiter, discovers a plot to deactivate it by the mission astronauts Dave Bowman and Frank Poole through lip reading their conversations.

In Orson Scott Card’s series (including Ender’s Game), the artificial intelligence can be spoken to while the protagonist wears a movement sensor in his jaw, enabling him to converse with the AI without making noise. He also wears an ear implant.

See also
 Automated Lip Reading
 Applications of artificial intelligence
 Electrolarynx
 List of emerging technologies
 Outline of artificial intelligence
 Subvocal recognition

References

Applications of artificial intelligence
Speech recognition
Speech synthesis
User interface techniques
Assistive technology